"I Just Don't Understand" is a song written by Marijohn Wilkin and Kent Westberry, released by Swedish-born singer and American citizen Ann-Margret. It charted at No. 17 on the US Billboard Hot 100 chart in 1961. It was one of the first records to feature a fuzz-tone guitar. It was later recorded by the Beatles on 16 July 1963 at the BBC Paris Studio, London for the Pop Go The Beatles radio show and appeared on their 1994 compilation album Live at the BBC, with lead vocals by John Lennon.

In 1965, Australian pop star Normie Rowe presented a rockier version. This appeared on the B-side of his Australian top 10 hit, "I (Who Have Nothing)".

The song was also covered by Willie Nelson, Jerry Reed,  Les Paul and Freddie and the Dreamers.

American indie rock band Spoon included a cover of the song on their 2014 album They Want My Soul.

The Beatles personnel 
 John Lennon – vocals, rhythm guitar
 Paul McCartney – backing vocals, bass
 George Harrison – backing vocals, lead guitar
 Ringo Starr – drums

References

1961 songs
The Beatles songs
Songs written by Marijohn Wilkin
Song recordings produced by George Martin
RCA Victor singles